Harbach may refer to:

Locations

 Harbach (Landkreis Altenkirchen), a municipality in Altenkirchen, Rhineland-Palatinate, Germany
 Harbach, a village in Grünberg, Gießen, Hesse, Germany
 Harbach, a cadastral community in Bad Hofgastein, St. Johann im Pongau, Salzburg, Austria

People

Barbara Harbach (born 1946), American composer, harpsichordist and organist
Chad Harbach (born 1975), American writer
Otto Harbach (1873–1963), American lyricist and librettist
William O. Harbach (1919–2017), American television producer